Singapore started sending athletes to the Southeast Asian Games in 1959 as a founding member of the Southeast Asian Games Federation (SEAGF) alongside Burma (now Myanmar), Kampuchea (now Cambodia), Laos, Malaya (now Malaysia), and the Republic of Vietnam (South Vietnam). Thailand first competed in the Southeast Asian Peninsular Games (SEAPG) from its namesake of "Peninsular" meaning the Peninsular nations of Southeast Asia would be competing in the said games. There were 8 events held as a Southeast Asian Peninsular Games, 3 of which were held in Thailand. The 1963 edition of the games that would have been hosted by Cambodia was cancelled due to domestic political situation within the nation.

Singapore in the Southeast Asian Games is considered to be one of the toughest competitors in numerous events as they have established themselves as a powerhouse in the sports world in Southeast Asia. In the most-recent 2021 Southeast Asian Games in Vietnam, Singapore ranked fifth in the medal tally.

Singapore is set to host the 2029 Southeast Asian Games, after 14 years. The last time Singapore hosted the Games was in 2015.

History
Singapore has hosted the games four times. Singapore bided and hosted the 1973 Southeast Asian Peninsular Games in Singapore. They hosted again after 10 years later in 1983, and after another 10 years in 1993. Singapore last hosted the SEA Games in 2015 after 22 years. 

Singapore is set to host the 2029 Southeast Asian Games.

Medals by Games

References